Synoemis pandani is a species of beetle in the family Silvanidae, the only species in the genus Synoemis.

References

Cucujoidea genera